The 2016 AMA National Speedway Championship Series was staged over four rounds, held at Costa Mesa (May 22), Ventura (June 25), Industry (August 13) and Auburn (September 16). It was won by Billy Janniro, who beat Max Ruml and Dillon Ruml. It was the seventh title of Janniro's career, and his fourth in-a-row.

Event format 
Over the course of 20 heats, each rider races against every other rider once. The top eight scorers then reach the semi-finals, with first and second in those semi-finals reaching the final. Points are scored for every ride taken, including the semi-finals and final.

Classification

References 

AMA
United States
Speed
Speed